Shanique is a given name. Notable people with the name include:

Shanique Speight (born 1978), American politician
Shanique Palmer (born 1987), Jamaican communications consultant

Feminine given names